The York boat was a type of inland boat used by the Hudson's Bay Company to carry furs and trade goods along inland waterways in Rupert's Land, the watershed stretching from Hudson Bay to the eastern slopes of the Rocky Mountains. It was named after York Factory, the headquarters of the HBC, and modeled after the Orkney yole (itself a descendant of the Viking longship). Two variations to the York Boat were scows and "Sturgeon Heads."

History and economics

York boats were preferred as cargo carriers to the birchbark canoes used by the North West Company, because they were larger, carried more cargo and were safer in rough water. The boat's heavy wood construction was a significant advantage when travelling waterways where the bottom or sides of the hull were likely to strike rocks or ice. Canoes then were commonly constructed with soft hulls of birch bark or animal hide and were vulnerable to tears and punctures. The solid, all-wood hull of the York boat could simply bounce off or grind past obstacles that could easily inflict fatal damage on a soft-hulled vessel. That advantage became a disadvantage, though, when portaging was necessary. The boat was far too heavy to carry and the crew had to cut a path through the brush, lay poplar rollers and drag the boat overland. 

Crewing a York boat was an arduous task, and those who chose this life faced "unending toil broken only by the terror of storms," according to Sir John Franklin.

It had a pointed bow, a flat bottom, and a stern angled upward at 45°, making beaching and launching easier. The boat was propelled by oars and by a square canvas sail. It was steered by a long steering pole or, when under sail, by a rudder. It had a crew of between six and eight men. The first boat was built in 1749, and by the late 18th century there were boat-building stations from James Bay to Fort Chipewyan. The advent of the steamboat in the 19th century signalled the end for the York boat.

The very narrow Echimamish River flows from the Nelson River to the Hayes River, which thus connects Norway House, Manitoba with York Factory on Hudson Bay at the mouth of the Hayes. In some places the Echimamish is so narrow that the oars of the York boats touched the ground on either side.

A different boat: the Columbia boat
Boats smaller and lighter than the York boat, called the Columbia boat, were made specifically for use in the Columbia District and constructed on the Columbia River and its tributaries, where falls and rapids made portaging necessary.  In 1811 the American Pacific Fur Company introduced the use of bateaux (which is simply the French word plural form for boat) on the Columbia River, made of split or sawn cedar. After the NWC took over the PFC, they quickly started using cedar-planked canoes because birch bark suitable for canoes was not available in the Pacific Northwest. In the 1830s John Dunn of the HBC described the Columbia District bateaux as "made from quarter-inch pine board, and are thirty-two feet long, and six and a half feet wide in midships, with both ends sharp, and without a keel—worked, according to the circumstances of the navigation, with paddles, or with oars."

U.S. Navy Lt. Charles Wilkes, who visited the Pacific Northwest in 1841, described Columbia boats as having "great strength and buoyancy, carry three tons weight, and have a crew of eight men, besides a padroon. They are thirty feet long and five and a half feet beam, sharp at both ends, clinker-built, and have no knees. In building them, flat timbers of oak are bent to the requisite shape by steaming; they are bolted to a flat keel, at distances of a foot from each other. The planks are of cedar, and generally extend the whole length of the boat. The gunwale is of the same kind of wood, but the rowlocks are of birch. The peculiarity in the construction of these boats is, that they are only riveted at each end with a strong rivet, and being well gummed, they have no occasion for nailing. They answer, and indeed are admirably adapted to, all the purposes for which they are intended; are so light as to be easily transported over the portages by their crews, and in case of accident are easily repaired."

Current uses

A York boat was featured in the Hayes River program of Great Canadian Rivers series on TVO in 2001. The documentary shows a reconstructed boat, the Maryann Muminawatum, rowed from Norway House by eight rowers, a coxwain, and a steersman. Unlike the Hudson's Bay reconstruction, the replica York boat in this video shows crudely carved oars that are unnecessarily heavy while no stronger than a regular oar, as the midsection is left as a beam while the rowers' end tapers to a slender shaft. 

The Canadian TV documentary Quest for the Bay in 2002 described using a York boat to travel from Lake Winnipeg to Hudson Bay.

York boat races can still be seen in Norway House, Manitoba. Racers compete for a $25,000 top prize in a celebration called Treaty & York Boat Days.

In  2014, three new York Boats were installed at Lower Fort Garry, National Historic Site (Manitoba). This was part of a Parks Canada, National Reconciliation with the Metis People.

See also

 Canoe - the York boat's counterpart/competitor in the Canadian fur trade.
 Red River Cart
 Bateau
 York Factory Express
 Portage La Loche Brigade
 Voyageurs
 North American fur trade

References

External links
Fort Edmonton York boat photo
Hudson's Bay Company: Our History
 Old photographs & replica York boat in video. 

Hudson's Bay Company
Boat types
Lake Winnipeg
Fur trade